Abimbola Craig (born 3 November 1986) is a Nigerian Nollywood actress and producer that starred as Tiwalade in Skinny Girl in Transit. She originally was to be the producer of Skinny Girl in Transit but ended up being the lead. Since season 1, Abimbola has gone ahead to not only act as lead but has also produced Season 2 - Season 6 of SGIT.  Craig Also co-produced the Box office movie “Sugar Rush” in 2019, alongside Jadesola Osiberu.

Career
Craig previously worked as Head of Production at Ndani TV Communications, which is also known as Ndani TV, and produces shows including Skinny Girl in Transit,  Phases, Rumor Has It, The Juice, and Game On.
Craig also runs an online website and social media account where she regularly posts short videos about life issues or hot gists. She was part of the remake of Glamour Girls.

Filmography 

 My Wife & I (2017)
 Skinny Girl in Transit
 Phases
 Rumor Has It
 The Juice
 Game On

Awards and nominations

References

External links

Living people
1986 births
Actresses from Warri
Actresses from Lagos
Alumni of the University of Buckingham
Nigerian film producers
Nigerian film directors
Nigerian YouTubers
Nigerian lawyers
21st-century Nigerian actresses
Nigerian film actresses